Jeannie Mah (born 1952) is a Canadian ceramic artist who is known for creating ceramic vessels that function as thought-provoking sculptures.

Education 

Mah was born in Regina, Saskatchewan, and attended the University of Regina where she received a Bachelor of Education (1976). In 1979 she received an Advanced Diploma in Ceramics from Emily Carr Institute of Art and Design. In 1988, Mah completed a Certificat Practique de Langue Françaises at the Université de Perpignan, in Perpignan, France. In 1989, she received a Diplôme Semestriel de Langue et Civilisation Françaises from the  Université de la Sorbonne, in Paris, France. She returned to the University of Regina in 1993 to complete a Bachelor of Arts degree.

Publications 
Mah was a co-editor along with Lorne Beug and Anne Campbell of a book on the cultural geography of Regina, titled: Regina's Secret Spaces: Love and Lore of Local Geography (published in 2006).

Art 

Mah's work is made by hand, and some include various reflections upon historical events. Much of her work is focused on crafting vessels. Her art has been influenced by the shape and decoration of both the Kamares ware cups from Crete and the Sèvres ware teacups from France. Her works are often designed more for decoration than for practical use. They are often decorated with images such as historical images, landscapes and self-portraits. Mah's work as an ardent cineaste, francophile, and video artist also have an obvious influence on her ceramic sculptures. She credits Regina artist Jack Sures with inspiring her practice.

Curator Helen Marzolf described Mah's ceramic works as "ethereal... [the] cups, vases and pitchers are paper-thin, translucent and weightless. More than objects of technical virtuosity, these works hyperbolize the fragility of fine ceramics and the elasticity of porcelain."

Her work has been shown in various exhibitions in Canada and internationally.

Canada 
 The Godfrey Dean Art Gallery (2012, 2013 ) 
 Winnipeg Art Gallery (1999)
 Saskatchewan Arts Board
 MacKenzie Art Gallery 
 Canadian Clay and Glass Gallery
 Nouveau Gallery (2006, 2007, 2008, 2009, 2012, 2013, 2014)
 Burlington Art Gallery
 Museum of Civilization

International 
 Municipalité de Nyon (Switzerland)

References

External links
 Jeannie Mah at Galleries West

Further reading 
Chambers, Ruth. "Ceramic Installation-Towards a Self-definition." Ceramics Art and Perception 65 (2006): 81.

Gogarty, Amy. "Jeannie Mah: 2 or 3 Things I know About Her." Regina: Dunlop Art Gallery (1998).

Laviolette, M.-B. 2001. Cineramics. Calgary: The Art Gallery of Calgary.

1952 births
Living people
Artists from Regina, Saskatchewan
Canadian ceramists
Canadian women ceramists
University of Regina alumni
Women potters
Emily Carr University of Art and Design alumni